Sir William Lee  (2 August 16888 April 1754) was a British jurist and politician.

Life
He was the second son of Sir Thomas Lee, 2nd Baronet. He matriculated at Wadham College, Oxford in 1704, shortly after entering the Middle Temple; he did not take a degree, but was called to the bar in 1710. Member of Parliament for Wycombe from 1727 until 1730, he gave up the seat when he became a Justice of the King's Bench.

Lee was Lord Chief Justice of England and Wales from 8 June 1737 until his sudden death in 1754. He was appointed formally as Chancellor of the Exchequer as a temporary expedient on 8 March 1754, when Henry Pelham died, with his brother Sir George Lee as Under Treasurer of the Exchequer, until 6 April, his own death.

Lord Campbell noted that Lee "certainly stood up for the rights of woman more strenuously than any English judge before or since his time".

Notes

References
J. C. D. Clark, The Dynamics of Change: The Crisis of the 1750s and English Party Systems (Cambridge University Press, 2002).
Lord Campbell, The Lives of the Chief Justices of England: Volume III (Cockcroft and Co, 1878).

Lord chief justices of England and Wales
Chancellors of the Exchequer of Great Britain
1688 births
1754 deaths
Justices of the King's Bench
Members of the Parliament of Great Britain for English constituencies
British MPs 1727–1734
Members of the Privy Council of Great Britain
Lords of the Manor of Totteridge
Younger sons of baronets